Dunklin R-V School District is a school district headquartered in Herculaneum, Missouri in Greater St. Louis. The district serves several communities in Jefferson County, Missouri, including Herculaneum, Horine, Pevely, and the southwestern portion of the Barnhart area.

Schools

Pre-K
 Taylor Early Childhood Center

Elementary schools
 Pevely Elementary

Middle schools
 Senn-Thomas Middle School

High schools
 Herculaneum High School

References

External links
 

Education in Jefferson County, Missouri
School districts in Missouri